Namonuito is a Micronesian language of the Federated States of Micronesia. It is spoken on Namonuito Atoll.

References

Chuukic languages
Endangered Austronesian languages
Languages of the Federated States of Micronesia
Severely endangered languages